Chen Hsiu-pao (11 October 1972) is a Taiwanese politician.

Education
Chen was born on 11 October 1972.

Political career
Chen began her political career as a legislative assistant to her father, Chen Chin-ting. She was a member of the Changhua County Council from 2010 to 2020. Chen vacated her county council seat in 2020, after winning election to the 10th Legislative Yuan.

References

1972 births
Changhua County Members of the Legislative Yuan
Members of the 10th Legislative Yuan
Women local politicians in Taiwan
21st-century Taiwanese women politicians
Living people